Nakina Water Aerodrome  is located  north of Nakina, Ontario, Canada.

See also
 Nakina Airport
 Nakina/Lower Twin Lake Water Aerodrome

References

Registered aerodromes in Ontario
Transport in Thunder Bay District
Seaplane bases in Ontario